This is a list of the National Register of Historic Places listings in Lee County, Texas.

This is intended to be a complete list of properties listed on the National Register of Historic Places in Lee County, Texas. There are three properties listed on the National Register in the county. Two properties are Recorded Texas Historic Landmarks including one that is also a State Antiquities Landmark.

Current listings

The locations of National Register properties may be seen in a mapping service provided.

|}

See also

National Register of Historic Places listings in Texas
Recorded Texas Historic Landmarks in Lee County

References

External links

Lee County, Texas
Lee County
Buildings and structures in Lee County, Texas